In mathematics and computer science, Recamán's sequence is a well known sequence defined by a recurrence relation. Because its elements are related to the previous elements in a straightforward way, they are often defined using recursion.

It takes its name after its inventor , a Colombian mathematician.



Definition 

Recamán's sequence  is defined as:

 

The first terms of the sequence are:

0, 1, 3, 6, 2, 7, 13, 20, 12, 21, 11, 22, 10, 23, 9, 24, 8, 25, 43, 62, 42, 63, 41, 18, 42, 17, 43, 16, 44, 15, 45, 14, 46, 79, 113, 78, 114, 77, 39, 78, 38, 79, 37, 80, 36, 81, 35, 82, 34, 83, 33, 84, 32, 85, 31, 86, 30, 87, 29, 88, 28, 89, 27, 90, 26, 91, 157, 224, 156, 225, 155, ...

On-line encyclopedia of integer sequences (OEIS) 

Recamán's sequence was named after its inventor, Colombian mathematician Bernardo Recamán Santos, by Neil Sloane, creator of the On-Line Encyclopedia of Integer Sequences (OEIS).

Even when Neil Sloane has collected more than 325,000 sequences since 1964, the Recamán's sequence was referenced in his paper My favorite integer sequences. He also stated that of all the sequences in the OEIS, this one is his favorite to listen to (you can hear it below).

Visual representation 

The most-common visualization of the Recamán's sequence is simply plotting its values, such as the figure at right.

On January 14, 2018, the Numberphile YouTube channel published a video titled The Slightly Spooky Recamán Sequence, showing a visualization using alternating semi-circles, as it is shown in the figure at top of this page.

Sound representation 

Values of the sequence can be associated with musical notes, in such that case the running of the sequence can be associated with an execution of a musical tune.

Properties 

The sequence satisfies:

 
 

Conjecture 

Neil Sloane has conjectured that every number eventually appears, but it has not been proved. Even though 10230 terms have been calculated (in 2018), the number 852,655 has not appeared on the list.

Uses 

Besides its mathematical and aesthetic properties, Recamán's sequence can be used to secure 2D images by steganography.

Alternate sequence 

The sequence is the most-known sequence invented by Recamán. There is another sequence, less known, defined as:

 
 

References

External links 
 
 
 The Recamán's sequence at Rosetta Code

Sequences and series
Integer sequences
Recurrence relations